Spacing Modifier Letters is a Unicode block containing characters for the IPA, UPA, and other phonetic transcriptions. Included are the IPA tone marks, and modifiers for aspiration and palatalization. The word spacing indicates that these characters occupy their own horizontal space within a line of text. Its block name in Unicode 1.0 was simply Modifier Letters.

Character table

Compact table

History
The following Unicode-related documents record the purpose and process of defining specific characters in the Spacing Modifier Letters block:

See also 
 Phonetic symbols in Unicode

References 

Unicode blocks